The Venus flytrap (Dionaea muscipula) is a carnivorous plant.

Venus Flytrap or Venus Fly Trap may also refer to:

Music
 Venus Fly Trap (band), a British alternative rock group (late 1980s–1997)
 Venus Flytrap (group), a Thai pop music group
 Venus Flytrap (rock band), a Dutch indie rock band
 "Venus Fly Trap" (Marina song), a 2021 song by Welsh singer-songwriter Marina
 "Venus Flytrap", a 2011 song by Philippine rock duo Turbo Goth

Other uses
 Venus Flytrap (film) (aka Akuma no Niwa (The Devil's Garden) and The Revenge of Doctor X), a 1970 American/Japanese horror film
 Venus Flytrap (WKRP in Cincinnati), a character on the television situation comedy WKRP in Cincinnati
 Venus flytrap sea anemone, a large sea anemone resembling a Venus flytrap
 Venus The Flytrap, a 1990 video game for Amiga and Atari ST

See also
 Venus McFlytrap, a character from Monster High
 Venus Firetrap, a character in the Super Mario video game series
 "Venus Fly", a song by Grimes from her 2015 album Art Angels